Philautus acutus is a species of frog in the family Rhacophoridae.
It is found in Malaysia and possibly Brunei.
Its natural habitat is subtropical or tropical moist montane forests.

References

External links
 Sound recordings of Philautus acutus at BioAcoustica

acutus
Amphibians described in 1987
Taxonomy articles created by Polbot